Edward Weah Dixon (born May 8, 1976) is a Liberian former professional footballer who played as a midfielder. He is a former member of the Liberia national team.

External links
 
 Edward Weah Dixon suspended 
 

Living people
1976 births
Sportspeople from Monrovia
Liberian footballers
French footballers
Association football midfielders
Liberia international footballers
2002 African Cup of Nations players
Olympique Alès players
Nîmes Olympique players
Luçon FC players
Football Bourg-en-Bresse Péronnas 01 players
Thouars Foot 79 players
Stade Beaucairois players
Liberian expatriate footballers
Liberian expatriate sportspeople in France
Expatriate footballers in France